Squadron Leader David Mary Tidmarsh  (28 January 1892 – 27 November 1944) was an Irish-born flying ace of the Royal Flying Corps during the First World War, credited with seven aerial victories.

Personal life
Tidmarsh was born on Circular Road, Limerick, to David Tidmarsh, a merchant originally from Kilkenny, and Elizabeth (Lillie) Murray, who was from Tipperary. A brother of his, John Moriarty Tidmarsh, of the No. 24 Squadron RFC, was accidentally killed in a flying accident at Doncaster on 3 September 1918.

World War I
Tidmarsh was commissioned as a second lieutenant in the 4th Battalion, Royal Irish Regiment (Special Reserve) on 23 April 1915. He was soon transferred to the Royal Flying Corps, beginning his flight training at Shoreham on 27 August 1915, and received Royal Aero Club Aviator's Certificate No. 1833 after soloing a Maurice Farman biplane at the Military School, Ruislip on 7 October. On 13 January 1916 he was appointed a flying officer in the RFC.

Posted to No. 24 Squadron, he was piloting an Airco DH.2 on 2 April 1916 when he scored his—and his squadron's—first victory, destroying a German Albatros two-seater and killing its crew of Karl Oscar Breibisch-Guthmann and Paul Wein. On 21 April, a dud anti-aircraft shell blew through the nacelle of his plane without harming him. On 25 April, Tidmarsh was flying Airco DH.2 No. 5965, escorting a mission of Royal Aircraft Factory F.E.2s, when he dived on an approaching Fokker Eindekker fighter. It fled. He pursued. The German had a 500-yard lead on Tidmarsh, who was not close enough to fire, when the Fokker lost its wings at an altitude of 1,000 feet. A German report would later blame flying wires severed by bullets for breaking up the aircraft. However, Tidmarsh received credit for the victory, his second. He would score once more while with No. 24 Squadron, when he set a two-seater on fire on 20 May 1916, killing Franz Patzig and Georg Loenholdt.

Tidmarsh was awarded the Military Cross on 31 May 1916. The citation read:
2nd Lt. David Mary Tidmarsh, 4th Bn., R. Ir. R. (Spec. Res.) and R.F.C.
"For conspicuous gallantry and skill when attacking hostile aircraft on several occasions, notably on one occasion when he dived at an enemy machine and drove it down wrecked to the ground."

Tidmarsh then went on leave to England, followed by duties as an instructor there. He was promoted to lieutenant on 1 July 1916, and appointed a flight commander with the temporary rank of captain on 16 August 1916. He returned to combat in March 1917 with No. 48 Squadron, flying the new Bristol F.2 Fighter. In four days fighting, between 8 and 11 April, he was part of various formations that won victories over four more aircraft. On 11 April 1917, after the destruction of two Albatros D.IIIs, Tidmarsh was shot down by Leutnant Kurt Wolff of Jasta 11, and spent the rest of the war as a prisoner of war.  He was repatriated to the United Kingdom, arriving at Hull on 30 December 1918. He was placed on the RAF unemployed list on 28 October 1919, and relinquished his army commission on 1 April 1920.

List of aerial victories

World War II
With the outbreak of World War II imminent, he was recommissioned as a flying officer in the Administrative and Special Duties Branch of the Royal Air Force Volunteer Reserve on 31 August 1939. He was promoted to temporary squadron leader on 1 September 1942, and relinquished his commission due to ill-health on 20 January 1944. He died in a Dublin nursing home on 27 November 1944, just 18 days after his brother Gerard, who was serving as a major in the British Army.

References

Bibliography

1892 births
1944 deaths
British Army personnel of World War I
Military personnel from Limerick (city)
Royal Irish Regiment (1684–1922) officers
Royal Flying Corps officers
Recipients of the Military Cross
Irish World War I flying aces
World War I prisoners of war held by Germany
British World War I prisoners of war
Royal Air Force Volunteer Reserve personnel of World War II
Royal Air Force squadron leaders